Donald Desbrow Whillans (18 May 1933 – 4 August 1985) was an English rock climber and mountaineer. He climbed with Joe Brown and Chris Bonington on many new routes, and was considered the technical equal of both.

Early life
Born and brought up in a two-up two-down house in Salford, Lancashire, Whillans began hiking on the Pennine moors while still at Broughton modern school; climbing was the next step for an adventurous young boy.

Career
Whillans was an apprentice plumber when he started his climbing career with Joe Brown in 1951. Whillans met Brown while climbing at the Roaches in Staffordshire. When Brown's climbing partner failed to follow him up a new route, Whillans asked if he could try—and subsequently led the second pitch of Brown's new route, which became known as "Matinee".

From rock climbing he expanded into mountaineering with trips to the Alps where ascents included the "Bonatti Pillar" of the Dru and the first ascent with Chris Bonington, Jan Długosz and Ian Clough of the Central Pillar of Freney on Mont Blanc. In 1962 with Bonington he made the first ascent of the Central Torres del Paine, Patagonia and with Dougal Haston, he made the first ascent of the south face of Annapurna in Bonington's 1970 expedition.

Whillans was attributed with safety and mountain awareness, as evidenced by his retreat from the Eiger North Face on several occasions because of bad weather or rockfall. He had few climbing accidents although there were several near misses, such as when a fixed rope on the Central Torres del Paine snapped and he managed to put his weight on the holds with split-second timing before retying the rope.

Personality
Whillans was well regarded for his capacity to deliver a cracking one-liner off the cuff. One example which encapsulates his wry humour concerns him encountering a team of—to his mind—poorly equipped Japanese mountaineers attempting the north face of the Eiger. "You going up?" Whillans asked them. "Yes! Yes!" came the reply. Pause, then Whillans: "You may be going a lot higher than you think."

Whillans participated in the 1971 International Expedition and 1972 European Everest Expedition, each attempting to climb Mount Everest's southwest face. The latter expedition was plagued with personality conflicts and the withdrawal of many climbers. While in camp, some other climbers overheard news that England had lost a football match to Germany. "It seems we have beaten you at your national sport", said a German. After a pause Whillans replied, "Aye, and we've beaten you at yours...twice." Another incident occurred one night in an alpine hut when two climbers were engaged in a whispered conversation disturbing the sleep of other climbers, one of whom was Whillans. Eventually he demanded that they shut up; there was a brief pause before one of the youths aggressively refused to be quiet, remarking into the darkness "Who do you think you are?" The gruff reply of "Whillans" was followed by complete silence. However, Whillans's biographer Jim Perrin suggests many of these stories are myths. Whillans liked to emphasise his working class credentials, and on lecture tours, enjoyed telling the story of being stormbound in a tent high in the Himalayas with Dougal Haston who had finished reading The Lord of the Rings and passed him the book. Whillans read a few pages and remarked: "I'm not reading that crap, it's full of fooking fairies"!

Whillans was a heavy drinker, which harmed his career after the expedition to Annapurna and may have contributed to his early death. Although he was only 5' 4" tall, he had a reputation as a brawler and stories of his prowess circulated.

He designed mountaineering equipment, including the "Whillans Harness", once described as designed to safely transport beer-guts to great height, and the "Whillans-box" expedition tent.

Death
He died at the age of 52 of a heart attack and was the subject of a biography titled The Villain by the author–climber Jim Perrin in 2005.

Legacy
The British Mountaineering Council maintain a climbing hut near the Roaches in memory of Whillans.

References 
 Jim Perrin (2005), The Villain : the Life of Don Whillans, Hutchinson, .
 Whillans, Don & Ormerod, Alick (1971), "Don Whillans. Portrait of a Mountaineer.", Heinemann, London (Harmondsworth, Penguin Books, 1973).
 Don Whillans – Myth and Legend (2006) – film by Leo Dickinson
 Tom Patey – A Short Walk With Whillans – SMC Journal 1963, and included in Mirrors in the Cliffs ed. Jim Perrin, Diadem 1983

Notes

External links 
List of Joe Brown's first ascents, including many with Don Whillans
"The vertical beatnik", Observer Sport Monthly, 6 March 2005
Peter Donnelly, 'Whillans, Donald Desbrow (1933–1985)', Oxford Dictionary of National Biography, Oxford University Press, Sept 2004; online edn, May 2006
The Don Whillans Memorial Hut Information page at the BMC website
Don Whillans - Myth and Legend by Leo Dickinson introduces his new film, exploring the myths and legends of rock climber Don Whillans
Don Whillan's Last Climb Filmed shortly before his death, Whillans and Joe Brown re-climb Cemetery Gates in Llanberis Pass 33 years after their first ascent.

1933 births
1985 deaths
British rock climbers
English mountain climbers
People from Salford
British plumbers
20th-century British businesspeople